Maura is a genus of grasshoppers in the tribe Dictyophorini and the family Pyrgomorphidae; it is native to sub-Saharan Africa.

Species
The Orthoptera Species File lists:
 Maura bolivari Kirby, 1902
 Maura lurida (Fabricius, 1781)
 Maura marshalli Bolívar, 1904
 Maura rubroornata (Stål, 1855) - type species (as Petasia rubroornata Stål)

References

External links 
 

Pyrgomorphidae
Orthoptera of Africa
Caelifera genera